The men's 800 metres at the 2011 European Athletics U23 Championships were held at the Městský stadion on 14 and 15 July.

Medalists

Schedule

Results

Round 1
Qualification: First 2 in each heat (Q) and 2 best performers (q) advance to the Final.

Final

Participation
According to an unofficial count, 19 athletes from 12 countries participated in the event.

References 

800 M
800 metres at the European Athletics U23 Championships